Prince George South was a provincial electoral district in the Canadian province of British Columbia beginning with the election of 1979. It was created from Fort George and a small part of Cariboo. It was abolished prior to the 1991 election into Prince George-Mount Robson and Prince George-Omineca.

Former provincial electoral districts of British Columbia